Paweł Łakomy (born 1975 in Kościan) is a Polish sprint canoer who competed in the late 1990s. He won a silver medal in the K-4 200 m event at the 1999 ICF Canoe Sprint World Championships in Milan.

References

Living people
Polish male canoeists
Place of birth missing (living people)
ICF Canoe Sprint World Championships medalists in kayak
1975 births
People from Kościan